Bernard L. Boutin (July 2, 1923 – August 24, 2011) was an American politician who served as Mayor of Laconia from 1955 to 1959, Administrator of the General Services Administration from 1961 to 1964 and as Administrator of the Small Business Administration from 1966 to 1967.

He died on August 24, 2011, in Laconia, New Hampshire at age 88.

References

1923 births
2011 deaths
Administrators of the General Services Administration
Administrators of the Small Business Administration
New Hampshire Democrats
People from Belmont, New Hampshire
People from Meredith, New Hampshire
Kennedy administration personnel
Lyndon B. Johnson administration personnel